Olympique de Marseille just missed out on Champions League qualification, but recorded 60 league points, an improvement on previous seasons. New signing Franck Ribéry got an international breakthrough, being linked to transfers to several European top clubs and being instrumental in France reaching the final of the World Cup. In spite of all rumours, Ribéry would stay at the club for a further season. That did not apply to manager Jean Fernandez, who left for Auxerre at the end of the season.

Squad

Goalkeepers
  Fabien Barthez
  Cédric Carrasso
  Yannick Quesnel

Defenders
  André Luís
  Taye Taiwo
  Demetrius Ferreira
  Frédéric Déhu
  Abdoulaye Méïté
  Jérôme Bonnissel
  Alain Cantareil
  Boštjan Cesar
  Renato Civelli
  Mehdi Benatia

Midfielders
  Franck Ribéry
  Samir Nasri
  Delfim
  Wilson Oruma
  Sabri Lamouchi
  Lorik Cana
  Laurent Batlles

Attackers
  Toifilou Maoulida
  Mamadou Niang
  Christian Giménez
  Mickaël Pagis

Competitions

Ligue 1

League table

Results summary

Results by round

Matches

Coupe de France

Coupe de la Ligue

Intertoto Cup

Third round

Semi–finals

Final

UEFA Cup

First round

Group stage

Knockout phase

Round of 32

Round of 16

Sources
  LFP.fr 2005-2006

Olympique de Marseille seasons
Marseille